Abandoned is a 1949 American crime film noir directed by Joseph M. Newman and starring Dennis O'Keefe, Gale Storm and Jeff Chandler.

It is also known as Abandoned Women and Not Wanted.

Plot
After her sister goes missing in Los Angeles, a woman tries to find information about the disappearance at city hall. The police are not helpful, but she does get support from a local crime reporter. As the two investigate the disappearance together, they are led to a shady detective and a black-market baby ring.

Cast
 Dennis O'Keefe as Mark Sitko
 Gale Storm as Paula Considine
 Jeff Chandler as Chief MacRae
 Meg Randall as Dottie Jensen
 Raymond Burr as Kerric
 Marjorie Rambeau as Mrs. Donner
 Jeanette Nolan as Major Ross
 Mike Mazurki as Hoppe
 Will Kuluva as "Little Guy" Decola
 David Clarke as Harry
 William Frambes as Scoop (as William Page)
 Sid Tomack as Mr. Humes
 Perc Launders as Dowd
 Steve Darrell as Brenn
 Clifton Young as Eddie
 Ruth Sanderson as Mrs. Spence

Production
The film was one of a series of semi-documentary movies that were popular at the time. It was based on an original story by Irwin Gielgud commissioned by producer Jerry Bresler. Director Joseph M. Newman and Bresler had previously worked together in the shorts department at MGM. Ann Blyth was originally announced for the female lead.

It was shot on the Universal backlot and on location in Los Angeles.

Jeff Chandler made the film before Broken Arrow. However, after being cast in that film, he was given star billing for Abandoned.

Reception

Critical response
A.W., writing for The New York Times called the film a "briskly-paced thriller" but said the movie "proceeds along conventional melodramatic lines".

This was Chandler's first film for Universal under a long term contract, and the positive response to his performance began his graduation into leading roles.

See also
 List of American films of 1949

References

External links
 
 
 
 
 
 

1949 films
1940s crime thriller films
American crime thriller films
American black-and-white films
1940s English-language films
Film noir
Universal Pictures films
Films directed by Joseph M. Newman
1940s American films